Willi Meurer (10 September 1915 – 28 September 1981) was a German cyclist. He competed in the individual and team road race events at the 1936 Summer Olympics.

References

External links
 

1915 births
1981 deaths
German male cyclists
Olympic cyclists of Germany
Cyclists at the 1936 Summer Olympics
Cyclists from Cologne